The 1936 Creighton Bluejays football team was an American football team that represented Creighton University as a member of the Missouri Valley Conference (MVC) during the 1936 college football season. In its second season under head coach Marchmont Schwartz, the team compiled a 4–4 record (3–0 against MVC opponents), tied for the conference championship, and outscored opponents by a total of 102 to 72. The team played its home games at Creighton Stadium in Omaha, Nebraska.

Schedule

References

Creighton
Creighton Bluejays football seasons
Missouri Valley Conference football champion seasons
Creighton Bluejays football